Duncan Kgopolelo (born 24 September 1974) is a Botswana footballer who currently plays as a striker for Police XI. He played for the Botswana national football team between 2003 and 2006.

External links
 

Association football forwards
Botswana footballers
Botswana international footballers
1974 births
Living people
Botswana Police XI SC players
Wonder Sporting Club players